The Thessaloniki Inner Ring Road is a dual carriageway ring road encircling most of the Thessaloniki Urban Area in Central Macedonia, Greece. Planned in 1975 and put into service in the 1990s, it consists of the Western Ring section, and of the main Inner Ring section. With three lanes per direction it carries over 120.000 cars per day, making it one of the country's most busy highway sections.

Course 
The Western Ring section starts at a coastal spur highway, the Thessaloniki New Western Entrance (signposted as part of the A2 motorway). Passing by the municipalities Ampelokipoi-Menemeni, Kordelio-Evosmos and Pavlos Melas it joins the A24 motorway (Promachonas–Nea Moudania) near Efkarpia. The Western Ring section has been recently upgraded to full Motorway standard in its biggest part with five new intersections have been built.

The A24 motorway forms the 21 km main section of the Inner Ring. Following the outline of the city's eastern periphery, it separates the city from the forests of Kedrinos Lofos (Cedar Hill) known as "Seich Sou" (Sheikh's water). When the road was planned in the 1970s, this fact drew massive protests by what would become the country's pioneer environmentalist movement, the Ecological Movement of Thessaloniki.

In southern Thessaloniki, A123 motorway forms a short extension of the Thessaloniki Inner Ring connecting it with National Road 16 and the Thessaloniki Airport.

Exit list

References

Highways in Greece
Roads in Central Macedonia
Transport in Thessaloniki
Ring roads in Greece